Claire Clémence de Maillé (25 February 1628 – 16 April 1694) was a French noblewoman from the Brézé family and a niece of Cardinal Richelieu. She married Louis de Bourbon, Prince of Condé, known as Le Grand Condé (The Great Condé), and became the mother of Henri Jules. She was Princess of Condé and Duchess of Fronsac.

Life
Claire Clémence was born at Brézé in the historical province of Anjou, France, as the daughter of Urbain de Maillé, marquis de Brézé, seigneur de Milly, seigneur de Thévalles, and Marshal of France. Her mother was Nicole du Plessis, the sister of Cardinal Richelieu. She had an older brother, Jean Armand de Maillé-Brézé, who became an Admiral of the French Royal Navy (La Royale).

When she was five years old, her uncle, the Cardinal, arranged her betrothal to the French prince du sang, Louis de Bourbon, who would become the renowned general le Grand Condé, "the Great Condé." Under the pretext of educating her, she was taken from her family and entrusted to Mme Boutillier, wife of the Superintendent of Finance, who gave her a mediocre education.

In 1641, Claire Clémence married Louis at Milly-le-Meugon. Louis, then the duc d'Enghien, was barely twenty years old and had already had several mistresses. In love at the time with Marthe Poussard (called Mlle du Vigean), he protested in vain against the marriage, but his father, Henri, Prince of Condé, forced him to wed Claire Clémence.

The marriage took place on 11 February 1641 at the Palais-Royal in Paris.

As she married a member of the reigning House of Bourbon, she became a Princess of the Blood and had the style Serene Highness. After his father's death in 1646, her husband became the First Prince of the Blood, which was the most important rank behind that of the members of the royal family.

Although Claire bore her husband three children, he later claimed she committed adultery with a number of different men in order to justify locking her away at Châteauroux, but the charge was widely disbelieved: Claude de Rouvroy, duc de Saint-Simon, who admitted that she was homely and dull, however praised her virtue, piety, and gentleness in the face of relentless abuse.

Upon her estranged husband's disgrace, arrest and imprisonment, in January 1650, at the fortress of Vincennes, after the Fronde, Claire Clémence distinguished herself by her energetic and devoted conduct, pursuing the struggle, raising his friends, leading them in danger and braving the king's anger, Mazarin's orders, and popular threats.

To get to the fortress of Montrond
, the cardinal set out on a long journey from Bordeaux, via Poitou, Anjou and Touraine. She stopped him at Milly-le-Meugon, using his short stay to recruit her husband's friends from all parts. While Condé's faithful intendant, Lenet, came through France and Spain, and readied Montrond for a siege that would take the French army more than a year to raise, Claire Clémence gathered her faithful friends around her and gave splendid celebrations at Milly-le-Meugon in favour of all the organisers of the resistance during the Fronde. Despite her efforts, however, her husband remained imprisoned until 7 February 1651.

In 1651, Claire Clémence was forced to submit to the regent, Queen Anne of Austria, and to her minister, Mazarin.

She thus joined her husband in Spanish Flanders with their son. They only returned to favour in 1660, reinstalling themselves at the Château de Chantilly. However, when a scandal arose because of her liaison with a page, the Prince exiled his wife to the Château Raoul in Châteauroux, where she remained until her death in 1694. She saw the birth of her first grandchild, Marie Thérèse de Bourbon, Mademoiselle de Bourbon in 1666; her first great-grandchild, Marie Anne de Bourbon, Mademoiselle de Conti, was born in 1689, she later became Princess of Condé, the title that Claire Clémence held for some time.

Claire Clémence was buried at the Chapel of St Martin  at the Château de Châteauroux, France.

Issue

Henri Jules, Prince of Condé (29 July 1643, Paris – 1 April 1709, Paris), married Anne Henriette of Bavaria and had issue.
Louis de Bourbon, Duke of Bourbon (20 September 1652, Bordeaux – 11 April 1653, Bordeaux), died in infancy.
Mademoiselle de Bourbon (12 November 1657, Breda – 28 September 1660, Paris), died in childhood.

Her descendants include the present-day pretenders to the throne of France and Italy and the kings of Spain and Belgium.

Portrayal in film
In the film Vatel, a 2000 film based on the life of 17th century French chef François Vatel, directed by Roland Joffé and starring Gérard Depardieu, Uma Thurman, and Tim Roth. Claire Clémence is portrayed by Arielle Dombasle.

References

Sources

Further reading

 Lenet, Pierre (1826) Mémoires. (Collection des Mémoires relatifs à l’histoire de France; eds. Petitot et Monmerqué; tome LIII). Paris: Librairie Foucault

1628 births
1694 deaths
Claire Clemence
Claire Clemence
Claire Clemence
17th-century French people
Claire Clemence
Claire Clemence
Fronsac, Duchess of, Claire Clemence
17th-century peers of France